The 2017 Ecuador Open Quito was an ATP tennis tournament played on outdoor clay courts. It was the 3rd edition of the Ecuador Open Quito as part of the ATP World Tour 250 series of the 2017 ATP World Tour. It took place in Quito, Ecuador from February 6 through February 12, 2017.

Points and prize money

Point distribution

Prize money

Singles main-draw entrants

Seeds 

 1 Rankings are as of January 30, 2017.

Other entrants 
The following players received wildcards into the singles main draw:
  Emilio Gómez
  Giovanni Lapentti
  Janko Tipsarević

The following players received entry from the qualifying draw:
  Roberto Carballés Baena
  Alejandro Falla
  Federico Gaio
  Agustín Velotti

Withdrawals 
Before the tournament
  Pablo Carreño Busta →replaced by  Rajeev Ram
  Íñigo Cervantes →replaced by  João Souza
  Guido Pella →replaced by  Alessandro Giannessi
  João Sousa →replaced by  Andrej Martin

Doubles main-draw entrants

Seeds 

 1 Rankings are as of January 30, 2017.

Other entrants 
The following pairs received wildcards into the doubles main draw:
  Gonzalo Escobar /  Juan Pablo Paz
  Giovanni Lapentti /  Nicolás Lapentti

Champions

Singles 

  Víctor Estrella Burgos def.  Paolo Lorenzi, 6–7(2–7), 7–5, 7–6(8–6)

Doubles

  James Cerretani /  Philipp Oswald def.  Julio Peralta /  Horacio Zeballos, 6–3, 2–1, ret.

References

External links 
 

Ecuador Open Quito
Ecuador Open (tennis)